Unthank is a village near Dalston in Cumbria, England. It is first mentioned in writing in 1332.

References

Hamlets in Cumbria
Dalston, Cumbria